Susette Gontard (née Borkenstein; 1769 – 1802), dubbed Diotima by the German poet Friedrich Hölderlin after Diotima of Mantinea, was the inspiration for Hölderlin's novel Hyperion, published in 1797–1799. She was the wife of Hölderlin's employer, the Frankfurt banker Jakob Friedrich Gontard. It is generally believed that the poet's fatal passion for her contributed to his descent into insanity and ultimate death. Hölderlin and Gontard exchanged a large body of letters, which was preserved and has been published in many editions.

References

1769 births
1802 deaths
18th-century German writers
German letter writers
Women letter writers
18th-century German women writers
18th-century German women